Sara Balzer (born 3 April 1995 in Strasbourg) is a French left-handed sabre fencer and 2021 team Olympic silver medalist.

Medal record

Olympic Games

World Championship

European Championship

World Cup

See also
 France at the 2019 Summer Universiade

References

External links
 Sara Balzer at FIG
 Le Sport au féminin
 Sport et citoyenneté

1995 births
Living people
French female sabre fencers
Universiade medalists in fencing
Universiade gold medalists for France
Universiade silver medalists for France
Universiade bronze medalists for France
Medalists at the 2015 Summer Universiade
Medalists at the 2019 Summer Universiade
European Games competitors for France
Fencers at the 2015 European Games
Olympic fencers of France
Fencers at the 2020 Summer Olympics
Olympic silver medalists for France
Olympic medalists in fencing
Medalists at the 2020 Summer Olympics
21st-century French women
World Fencing Championships medalists
French sportspeople of Algerian descent